Diana and Callisto is a painting produced by Peter Paul Rubens between 1637 and 1638. It was one of a number of paintings commissioned from the artist by Philip IV of Spain for his new hunting lodge, the Torre de la Parada. It measures 202 by 303 cm and is now in the Museo del Prado, in Madrid. It depicts Diana and Callisto.

External links
Prado page

1637 paintings
1638 paintings
Paintings by Peter Paul Rubens in the Museo del Prado
Paintings depicting Diana (mythology)
Paintings based on Metamorphoses
Deer in art
Callisto (mythology)